was a town located in Ihara District, Shizuoka Prefecture, Japan.

As of October 1, 2008, the town had an estimated population of 9,085 and a density of 394.5 persons per km². The total area was 23.03 km².

On November 1, 2008, Yui was merged into the Shimizu-ku ward of the expanded city of Shizuoka. Ihara District was dissolved as a result of this merger.

Town outline 

Yui's flag displayed the character "由" to represent the town and 12 stamens; one for each of the wards. These are contained within orange blossoms, a special product of Yui. Around the flower, a seagull represents peace and equality. Yui's symbols were the bush warbler, fragrant olive, and cherry blossoms.

The town had two elementary schools and one junior high school.

Yui is served by Yui Station on the Tōkaidō Main Line.

References

Populated places disestablished in 2008
2008 disestablishments in Japan
Dissolved municipalities of Shizuoka Prefecture
Shizuoka (city)